The Great Railroad Strike of 1877, sometimes referred to as the Great Upheaval, began on July 14 in Martinsburg, West Virginia,  after the Baltimore and Ohio Railroad (B&O) cut wages for the third time in a year. This strike finally ended 52 days later, after it was put down by unofficial militias, the National Guard, and federal troops.  Because of economic problems and pressure on wages by the railroads, workers in numerous other cities, in New York, Pennsylvania and Maryland, into Illinois and Missouri, also went out on strike. An estimated 100 people were killed in the unrest across the country. In Martinsburg, Pittsburgh, Philadelphia and other cities, workers burned down and destroyed both physical facilities and the rolling stock of the railroads—engines and railroad cars. Some locals feared that workers were rising in revolution such as the Paris Commune of 1871, while others joined their efforts against the railroads.

At the time, the workers were not represented by trade unions. The city and state governments were aided by unofficial militias, the National Guard, federal troops and private militias organized by the railroads, who all fought against the workers. Disruption was widespread and at its height, the strikes were supported by about 100,000 workers. With the intervention of federal troops in several locations, most of the strikes were suppressed by early August. Labor continued to work to organize into unions to work for better wages and conditions. Fearing the social disruption, many cities built armories to support the local National Guard units; these defensive buildings still stand as symbols of the effort to suppress the labor unrest of this period.

With public attention on workers' wages and conditions, the B&O in 1880 founded an Employee Relief Association to provide death benefits and some health care. In 1884, it established a worker pension plan. Other improvements were implemented later.

Panic of 1873 and the Long Depression
The Long Depression, beginning in the United States with the financial  Panic of 1873 and lasting 65 months, became the longest economic contraction in American history, including the later more famous, 45-month-long Great Depression of the 1930s. The failure of the Jay Cooke bank in New York, was followed quickly by that of Henry Clews, and set off a chain reaction of bank failures, temporarily closing the New York stock market.

Unemployment rose dramatically, reaching 14 percent by 1876, many more were severely underemployed, and  wages overall dropped to 45% of their previous level. Thousands of American businesses failed, defaulting on more than a billion dollars of debt. One in four laborers in New York were out of work in the winter of 1873-1874. National construction of new rail lines dropped from 7,500 miles of track in 1872 to just 1,600 miles in 1875, and production in iron and steel alone dropped as much as 45%.

Reason for strike
When the Civil War ended, a boom in railroad construction ensued, with roughly 35,000 miles (55,000 kilometers) of new track being laid from coast to coast between 1866 and 1873. The railroads, then the second-largest employer outside of agriculture, required large amounts of capital investment, and thus entailed massive financial risk. Speculators fed large amounts of money into the industry, causing abnormal growth and over-expansion. Jay Cooke's firm, like many other banking firms, invested a disproportionate share of depositors' funds in the railroads, thus laying the track for the ensuing collapse.

In addition to Cooke's direct infusion of capital in the railroads, the firm had become a federal agent for the government in the government's direct financing of railroad construction. As building new track in areas where land had not yet been cleared or settled required land grants and loans that only the government could provide, the use of Jay Cooke's firm as a conduit for federal funding worsened the effects that Cooke's bankruptcy had on the nation's economy.

In the wake of the Panic of 1873, a bitter antagonism between workers and the leaders of industry developed. Immigration from Europe was underway, as was migration of rural workers into the cities, increasing competition for jobs and enabling companies to drive down wages and easily lay off workers. By 1877, 10 percent wage cuts, distrust of capitalists and poor working conditions led to workers conducting numerous railroad strikes that prevented the trains from moving, with spiraling effects in other parts of the economy. Suppressed by violence, workers continued to organize to try to improve their conditions. Management worked to break up such movements, and mainstream society feared labor organizing as signs of revolutionary socialism. Tensions lingered well after the depression ended in 1878–79.

Many of the new immigrant workers were Catholics, and their church had forbidden participation in secret societies since 1743, partially as a reaction against the anti-Catholicism of Freemasonry. But by the late 19th century, the Knights of Labor, a national and predominately European and Catholic organization, had 700,000 members seeking to represent all workers. In 1888 Archbishop James Cardinal Gibbons of Baltimore sympathized with the workers and collaborated with other bishops to lift the prohibition against workers joining the KOL. Other workers also took actions, and unrest marked the following decades. In 1886 Samuel Gompers founded the American Federation of Labor for the skilled craft trades, attracting skilled workers from other groups. Other labor organizing followed.

Strike

The Great Railroad Strike of 1877 started on July 14 in Martinsburg, West Virginia, in response to the Baltimore & Ohio Railroad (B&O) cutting wages of workers for the third time in a year. Striking workers would not allow any of the trains, mainly freight trains, to roll until this third wage cut was revoked. West Virginia Governor Henry M. Mathews sent in National Guard units to restore train service but the soldiers refused to fire on the strikers.  The governor then appealed for federal troops.

Maryland

Meanwhile, the Strike also spread into western Maryland to the major railroad hub of Cumberland, county seat of Allegany County where railway workers stopped freight and passenger traffic.

In Baltimore, the famous Fifth ("Dandy Fifth") and Sixth Regiments of the former state militia, reorganized since the Civil War as the Maryland National Guard, were called up by Maryland Governor John Lee Carroll, at the request  of powerful B. & O. President John Work Garrett. The Fifth marched down North Howard Street from its armory above the old Richmond Market (at present North Howard and West Read Streets) in the Mount Vernon-Belvedere neighborhood and were generally unopposed heading south for the B. & O.'s general headquarters and main depot at the Camden Street Station to board waiting westward trains to Hagerstown and Cumberland. 
The Sixth assembled at its armory at East Fayette and North Front Streets (by the old Phoenix Shot Tower) in the Old Town /Jonestown area and headed to Camden. It had to fight its way west through sympathetic Baltimore citizens, rioters and striking workers. The march erupted into bloodshed along Baltimore Street, the main downtown commercial thoroughfare, the way to get to Camden. It was a horrible scene reminiscent of the worst of the bloody "Pratt Street Riots" of the Civil War era in April 1861, over 15 years earlier.  When the outnumbered troops of the 6th Regiment finally fired volleys on an attacking crowd, they killed 10 civilians and wounded 25. The rioters injured several members of the National Guard, damaged B. & O. engines and train cars, and burned portions of the train station at South Howard and West Camden Streets. The National Guard was trapped in the Camden Yards, besieged by armed rioters until July 21–22, when President Rutherford B. Hayes sent federal troops and the U.S. Marines to Baltimore to restore order.

New York
There were strike actions also further north in Albany, Syracuse and Buffalo, New York on other railroad lines. On July 25, 1877, workers gathered on Van Woert Street Rail Crossing in Albany, New York. The workers waited for a train arrival then proceeded to barrage the train with projectiles. The arrival of militiamen caused the crowd to rouse and throw their projectiles at the militia. A second night proceeded of attacks on the rail line. After the second night the mayor rescinded the militia and ordered local police to protect the rail. Workers in the cities in industries other than railroads still attacked them because of how they cut through the cities and dominated city life. Their resentment of the railroads' economic power was expressed in physical attacks against them at a time when many workers' wages were lowered. Protestors "included cross-class elements from other work sites, small businesses, and commercial establishments. Some protestors acted out of solidarity with the strikers, but many more vented militant displeasure against dangerous railroad traffic that crisscrossed urban centers in that area."

Pennsylvania

Pittsburgh

Pittsburgh, Pennsylvania became the site of the worst violence of related strikes. Thomas Alexander Scott of the Pennsylvania Railroad, described as one of the first robber barons, suggested that the strikers should be given "a rifle diet for a few days and see how they like that kind of bread." As in some other cities and towns, local law enforcement officers such as sheriffs, deputies and police refused to fire on the strikers.  Several Pennsylvania National Guard units were ordered into service by Governor John Hartranft, including the 3rd Pennsylvania Infantry Regiment under the command of Colonel George R. Snowden.

On July 21, National Guard members bayoneted and fired on rock-throwing strikers, killing 20 people and wounding 29. Rather than quell the uprising, these actions infuriated the strikers, who retaliated and forced the National Guard to take refuge in a railroad roundhouse. Strikers set fires that razed 39 buildings and destroyed rolling stock: 104 locomotives and 1,245 freight and passenger cars.  On July 22, the National Guard mounted an assault on the strikers, shooting their way out of the roundhouse and killing 20 more people on their way out of the city.  After more than a month of rioting and bloodshed in Pittsburgh, President Rutherford B. Hayes sent in federal troops as in West Virginia and Maryland to end the strikes.

Philadelphia
Three hundred miles to the east, Philadelphia strikers battled local National Guard units and set fire to much of downtown before Pennsylvania Governor John Hartranft gained assistance and federal troops from President Hayes to put down the uprising.

Reading

Workers in Reading, Pennsylvania's third-largest industrial city at the time, also broke out into a strike. This city was home of the engine works and shops of the Philadelphia and Reading Railway, against which engineers had struck since April 1877. The National Guard shot 16 citizens.  Preludes to the massacre included: fresh work stoppage by all classes of the railroad's local workforce; mass marches; blocking of rail traffic; and trainyard arson. Workers burned down the only railroad bridge offering connections to the west, in order to prevent local National Guard companies from being mustered to actions in the state capital of Harrisburg or Pittsburgh. Authorities used the National Guard, local police and Pinkerton detectives in an attempt to break the strike. Philadelphia and Reading Railway management mobilized a private militia, the members of which committed the shootings in the city.

Shamokin

On July 25, 1,000 men and boys, many of them coal miners, marched to the Reading Railroad Depot in Shamokin, east of Sunbury along the Susquehanna River valley. They looted the depot when the town announced it would pay them only $1/day for emergency public employment. The mayor, who owned coal mines, organized an unofficial militia. It committed 14 civilian shooting casualties, resulting in the deaths of two persons.

Scranton

On August 1, 1877, in Scranton in northeast Pennsylvania, one day after railroad workers commenced a strike, a city posse of 51 men armed with new rifles and under the command of William Walker Scranton, general manager of the Lackawanna Iron & Coal Company, returned fire on a group of rioters, strikers, and, most likely, bystanders. The posse immediately killed or fatally wounded four and wounded an undetermined number of others, estimated at 20 to 50, according to different sources.

Pennsylvania Governor Hartranft declared Scranton to be under martial law; it was occupied by state and federal troops armed with Gatling guns. Later the posse leader and about 20 of his men were charged with assault and murder. They were all acquitted. Under military occupation, and suffering the effects of protracted violence against them, the miners ended their strike without achieving any of their demands.

Illinois

On July 24, rail traffic in Chicago was paralyzed when angry mobs of unemployed citizens wreaked havoc in the rail yards, shutting down both the Baltimore and Ohio and the Illinois Central railroads.  Soon, other railroads throughout the state were brought to a standstill, with demonstrators shutting down railroad traffic in Bloomington, Aurora, Peoria, Decatur, Urbana and other rail centers throughout Illinois.  In sympathy, coal miners in the pits at Braidwood, LaSalle, Springfield, and Carbondale went on strike as well.  In Chicago, the Workingmen's Party organized demonstrations that drew crowds of 20,000 people.

Judge Thomas Drummond of the United States Court of Appeals for the Seventh Circuit, who was overseeing numerous railroads that had declared bankruptcy in the wake of the earlier financial Panic of 1873, ruled that "A strike or other unlawful interference with the trains will be a violation of the United States law, and the court will be bound to take notice of it and enforce the penalty."  Drummond told the U.S. Marshals  to protect the railroads, and asked for federal troops to enforce his decision: he subsequently had strikers arrested and tried them for contempt of court.

The Mayor of Chicago, Monroe Heath, recruited 5,000 men as an unofficial militia, asking for help in restoring order. They were partially successful, and shortly thereafter were reinforced by the arrival of the Illinois National Guard and U.S. Army troops, mobilized by the governor. On July 25, violence between police and the mob erupted, with events reaching a peak the following day. These blood-soaked confrontations between police and enraged mobs are known as the Battle of the Viaduct as they took place near the Halsted Street viaduct, although confrontations also took place at nearby 16th Street, on 12th, and on Canal Street. The headline of the Chicago Times screamed, "Terrors Reign, The Streets of Chicago Given Over to Howling Mobs of Thieves and Cutthroats." Order was finally restored. An estimated 20 men and boys died, none of whom were law enforcement or troops; scores more were wounded, and the loss of property was valued in the millions of dollars.

Missouri

On July 21, workers in the industrial rail hub of East St. Louis, Illinois, halted all freight traffic, with the city remaining in the control of the strikers for almost a week. The St. Louis Workingman's Party led a group of approximately 500 men across the Missouri River in an act of solidarity with the nearly 1,000 workers on strike.  It was a catalyst for labor unrest spreading, with thousands of workers in several industries striking for the eight-hour day and a ban on child labor. This was the first such general strike in the United States.

The strike on both sides of the river was ended after the governor appealed for help and gained the intervention of some 3,000 federal troops and 5,000 deputized special police. These armed forces killed at least eighteen people in skirmishes around the city. On July 28, 1877, they took control of the Relay Depot, the command center for the uprising, and arrested some seventy strikers.

Strike ends
The Great Railroad Strike of 1877 began to lose momentum when President Hayes sent federal troops from city to city.  These troops suppressed strike after strike, until approximately 45 days after it had started, the Great Railroad Strike of 1877 was over.

Aftermath and legacy

San Francisco riot of 1877 
Momentum from the East Coast strikes and the long-brewing anti-Chinese sentiment led to three days of deadly violence. A rally in support of workers' rights quickly turned into violence directed at the city's Chinese residents.

Economic effects 
Strikers in Pittsburgh burned in total 39 buildings, 104 engines, 46–66 passenger cars, and 1,200–1,383 freight cars. Damage estimates ranged from five to 10 million dollars.

Labor relations
After the Great Railroad Strike of 1877, union organizers planned for their next battles while politicians and business leaders took steps to prevent a repetition of this chaos. Many states enacted conspiracy statutes. States formed new National Guard units and constructed armories in numerous industrial cities. For workers and employers alike, the strikes had shown the power of workers in combination to challenge the status quo. A National Guard member in Pittsburgh, ordered to break the 1877 strike, pointed out that the workers were driven by "one spirit and one purpose among them – that they were justified in resorting to any means to break down the power of the corporations."

Unions became better organized as well as more competent, and the number of strikes increased. The tumultuous Knights of Labor grew to be a national organization of predominately white Catholic workers, numbering 700,000 by the early 1880s. In the 1880s nearly 10,000 strike actions and lockouts took place. In 1886 nearly 700,000 workers went on strike. Business leaders strengthened their opposition to the unions, often firing men who tried to organize or join them. Nonetheless, the labor movement continued to grow.

One result of the strike was increased public awareness of the grievances of railroad workers. On May 1, 1880, the B&O Railroad, which had the lowest wage rate of any major railroad, established the Baltimore and Ohio Employees' Relief Association, which provided coverage for sickness, injury from accidents, and a death benefit. In 1884, the B&O became the first major employer to offer a pension plan.

National Guard
Militias had almost completely disappeared in the Midwest after the Civil War, leaving many cities defenseless to civil unrest.
In response to the Great Strike, West Virginia Governor Henry M. Mathews was the first state commander-in-chief to call-up militia units to restore peace. This action has been viewed in retrospect as a catalyst that would transform the National Guard. In the years to come the Guard would quell strikers and double their forces; in the years 1886-1895, the Guard put down 328 civil disorders, mostly in the industrial states of Illinois, Pennsylvania, Ohio and New York; workers came to see the guardsmen as tools of their employers. Attempts to utilize the National Guard to quell violent outbreaks in 1877 highlighted its ineffectiveness, and in some cases its propensity to side with strikers and rioters. In response, as earlier riots in the mid-1800s had prompted the modernization of police forces, the violence of 1877 provided the impetus for modernizing the National Guard, "to aid the civil officers, to suppress or prevent riot or insurrections."

Commemoration
In 2003 the Baltimore and Ohio Railroad Martinsburg Shops, where the strike began, were declared a National Historic Landmark.

In 2013 a historical marker commemorating the event was placed in Baltimore, MD, by the Maryland Historical Trust and Maryland State Highway Administration. Its inscription reads:

The first national strike began July 16, 1877, with Baltimore and Ohio Railroad workers in Martinsburg, West Virginia, and Baltimore, Maryland. It spread across the nation halting rail traffic and closing factories in reaction to widespread worker discontent over wage cuts and conditions during a national depression. Broken by Federal troops in early August, the strike energized the labor movement and was precursor to labor unrest in the 1880s and 1890s.

Another was placed in 1978 in Martinsburg, WV by the West Virginia Department of Culture and History.

Posse Comitatus Act

The use of federal troops prompted bipartisan support for the 1878 Posse Comitatus Act, limiting the power of the president to use federal troops for domestic law enforcement.

See also

 Baltimore railroad strike of 1877
 Chicago railroad strike of 1877
 Pittsburgh railroad strike of 1877
 1877 St. Louis general strike
 Scranton general strike
 1877 Shamokin uprising
 Great Railroad Strike of 1922
 History of rail transport in the United States
 List of incidents of civil unrest in the United States

References

Further reading

 

  online
 DeMichele, Matthew. "Policing protest events: The Great Strike of 1877 and WTO protests of 1999." American Journal of Criminal Justice 33.1 (2008): 1-18.
 Jentz, John B., and Richard Schneirov. “Combat in the Streets: The Railroad Strike of 1877 and Its Consequences.” in Chicago in the Age of Capital: Class, Politics, and Democracy during the Civil War and Reconstruction (University of Illinois Press, 2012), pp. 194–219. online

 Lesh, Bruce. "Using Primary Sources to Teach the Rail Strike of 1877" OAH Magazine of History (1999) 13#w pp 38-47. DOI: 10.2307/25163309 online
 Lloyd, John P. "The strike wave of 1877" in The Encyclopedia of Strikes in American History (2009) pp 177-190. online

 Piper, Jessica. "The great railroad strike of 1877: A catalyst for the American labor movement." History Teacher 47.1 (2013): 93-110. online
 Roediger, David. " '‘Not Only the Ruling Classes to Overcome, but Also the So-Called Mob': Class, Skill and Community in the St. Louis General Strike of 1877." Journal of Social History 19#2 (1985), pp. 213–39. online

 Rondinole, Troy. "Drifting toward Industrial War: The Great Strike of 1877 and the Coming of a New Era." in The Great Industrial War: Framing Class Conflict in the Media, 1865-1950 (Rutgers University Press, 2010), pp. 38–57. online

 Salvatore, Nick. "Railroad Workers and the Great Strike of 1877," Labor History (1980) 21#4 pp 522–45 online
 Smith, Shannon M. “‘They Met Force with Force’: African American Protests and Social Status in Louisville’s 1877 Strike.” Register of the Kentucky Historical Society 115#1 (2017), pp. 1–37. online

 Stowell, David O. Streets, Railroads, and the Great Strike of 1877, University of Chicago Press, 1999
 Stowell, David O., editor. The Great Strikes of 1877, University of Illinois Press, 2008
 Stowell, David O. “Albany’s Great Strike of 1877.” New York History 76#1 , 1995, pp. 31–55. online
 Walker, Samuel C. “Railroad Strike of 1877 in Altoona.” Railway and Locomotive Historical Society Bulletin, no. 117, 1967, pp. 18–25. in Altoona, Pennsylvania online
 White, Richard. Railroaded: The Transcontinentals and the Making of modern America (W.W. Norton, 2011). online

 Yearley, Clifton K., Jr. "The Baltimore and Ohio Railroad Strike of 1877," Maryland Historical Magazine (1956) 51#3  pp. 118–211.

Primary sources
 "The Great Strike", Harper's Weekly, August 11, 1877. (Catskill Archive)
 "The B&O Railroad Strike of 1877." The Statesman (Martinsburg, WV), July 24, 1877. (West Virginia Division of Culture and History)
  online

Popular history
 "Catholics and Labor Unionization", American Catholic History Classroom, The Catholic University of America; Overview, archives and primary documents
 “Great Railroad Strike of 1877” Britannica 
 Illinois Museum of History

External links

 "The Strike of 1877." Teaching Resources—Maryland State Archives
 

1877 in rail transport
1877 in the United States
1877 labor disputes and strikes
Riots and civil disorder in Pittsburgh
Martinsburg, West Virginia
Political repression in the United States
Rail transportation labor disputes in the United States
1877 in West Virginia
Labor disputes in Illinois
Labor disputes in Pennsylvania
Labor disputes in West Virginia
Labor disputes in Maryland
Labor disputes in Missouri
Pinkerton (detective agency)
July 1877 events
August 1877 events
September 1877 events